Cork Gully was a British insolvency practice, pre-eminent in its field from the 1960s to 1990s. It then became part of PricewaterhouseCoopers, which stopped using the brand in 1999. In 2010 a new corporate restructuring practice, Cork Gully LLP, was established and acquired the brand.

Original firm
In 1906 William Henry Cork created WH Cork & Co, focusing on grocery businesses which were, at that time, being forced out of business by the growth of multiple grocers. In 1935 William Henry Cork formed a partnership with his son Kenneth, and Harry Gully, creating Cork Gully.  After William Henry Cork's death and a period of wartime service, his son Kenneth Cork succeeded him as senior partner. He went on to expand the firm as a specialist insolvency practice, gaining pre-eminence in its field by the 1970s.  Gerhard (Gerry) Weiss joined the firm in 1952, and was made the first insolvency partner in 1954.

Sir Kenneth Cork (as he later became known) chaired the Cork Committee, whose report issued in 1982 is widely referred to as the Cork Report which led to the passing of the Insolvency Act 1986. He also served as Lord Mayor of London in 1978–79.

Sir Kenneth's son Sir Roger Cork followed in his footsteps, both as a partner in Cork Gully and as Lord Mayor of London (1996–97).

In 1980 Sir Kenneth Cork's successor as senior partner, Michael Jordan, led the firm into a merger with Coopers & Lybrand, which continued to use the name. The Cork Gully brand was eventually discontinued in 1999 after Coopers and Lybrand itself merged with Price Waterhouse to form PwC.

The original firm's assignments included Rolls Razor, Emil Savundra, Barlow Clowes and car maker De Lorean.

Present day

In 2010 Stephen Cork, great grandson of William Henry Cork, acquired Cork Gully and the brand from PwC and established Cork Gully LLP, as a new restructuring firm in London. Stephen Cork was formerly the Head of Restructuring & Recovery at Smith & Williamson. The firm provides advice on business transformation, asset management, disputes, restructuring and insolvency.

References

External links
Cork Gully, website of the new firm
Family tree of Coopers & Lybrand (then also trading as Cork Gully), Peter Boys/ICAEW, 1989

Insolvency and corporate recovery firms
Accounting firms of the United Kingdom
Financial services companies established in 1935
Financial services companies disestablished in 1999
Financial services companies established in 2010
1935 establishments in England
1999 disestablishments in England
2010 establishments in England
1906 establishments in England